The number of national daily newspapers in Hungary was 21 in 1950 and it increased to 40 in 1965. In 1986 the Press Act became effective, regulating the newspaper market in the country. Following the collapse of the communist regime the act was revised in January 1990.

This is a list of Hungarian newspapers and other papers, online newspapers and portals as well.

National

Daily 
{| class="sortable wikitable"
! style="width:8%;"| Title
! style="width:6%;"| Language
! style="width:3%;"| Print / Online
! style="width:3%;"| Est.
! style="width:25%;"| Owner
! style="width:25%;"| Orientation
! style="width:20%;"| Link
|- 
| 24.hu || Hungarian || Online || 1996 || Central Media Group || Centre, liberalism || 
|-
| 444 || Hungarian || Online || 2013 || Magyar Jeti Zrt. || Left, liberalism || 
|-
| 888 || Hungarian || Online || 2015 || KESMA|| Right, conservatism || 
|-
| About Hungary || EnglishGerman || Online || 2013 || International Communications Office Cabinet Office of the Prime Minister || Official blog of the Prime Minister || 
|-
| Alfahír || Hungarian || Online || 2009 || Kiegyensúlyozott Médiáért Alapítvány || Right, nationalism || 
|-
| Átlátszó.hu || Hungarian || Online || 2011 || atlatszo.hu Közhasznú Nonprofit Kft. || Left, liberalism, investigative journalism || 
|-
| Blikk || Hungarian || Both || 1994 || Ringier-Axel Springer || Left, sensationalism, tabloid || 
|-
| Bors || Hungarian || Both || 1989 || KESMA || Right, sensationalism, tabloid || 
|-
| Budapester Zeitung || German || Online || 1999 || ? || Left, liberalism || 
|-
| Daily News Hungary || English || Online || 2013 || Márta Kató || Cultural || 
|-
|Ez a Lényeg
|Hungarian
|Online
|2019
|Oraculum 2020 Kft.
|Left, socialism
|ezalenyeg.hu
|-
| Hungary Today || English || Online || ? || Friends of Hungary Foundation || Pro-government || 
|-
| Index ||Hungarian || Online || 1995 || Indamedia Network Zrt. || Right, conservatism || 
|-
| Mérce || Hungarian || Online || 2008 || Kettős Mérce Blog Egyesület || Left, social democracy || 
|-
| Kitekintő || Hungarian || Online || 2007 || Flux Communications || Foreign policy || 
|-
|Kontra
|Hungarian
|Online
|2020
|Ctrl-T Creative Zrt.
|Right, conservatism
|kontra.hu
|-
| Kuruc.info || Hungarian || Online || 2006 || WBY Ltd. || Far-right, neo-Nazism || 
|-
| Le Journal Francophone de Budapest || French || Online || ? || ? || Cultural || 
|-
| Magyar Hírlap || Hungarian || Online || 1968 || Gábor Széles || Right, conservatism || 
|-
| Magyar Jelen || Hungarian || Online || ? || Innovatív Kommunikáció Alapítvány || Far-right, conservatism || 
|-
| Magyar Kurír || Hungarian || Online || 1911 || Catholic Bishops' Conference of Hungary || Catholic journalism || 
|-
|Magyar Nemzet ||Hungarian || Both || 1938 || KESMA || Right, conservatism || 
|-
|Media1
|Hungarian
|Online
|2019
|Media1 Digitális Média Kft.
|Media news
|media1.hu
|-
|Metropol
|Hungarian
|Both
|2020
|KESMA
|Right, conservatism
|metropol.hu
|-
| Napi.hu || Hungarian || Online || 1999 || Indamedia Network Zrt. || Left, business and finance || 
|-
| Nemzeti Sport || Hungarian || Both || 1903 || KESMA || Sports || 
|-
|Neokohn
|HungarianEnglish
|Online
|2019
|Brit Media Group
|Centre, Jewish journalism
|neokohn.hu
|-
| Népszava || Hungarian || Both || 1877 || Tamás Leisztinger || Left, social-democratic || 
|-
| Nyugati Fény || Hungarian || Online || 2012 || ? || Left, social liberalism || 
|-
| Origo|| Hungarian || Online || 1998 || KESMA || Right, conservatism || 
|-
| Pesti Bulvár || Hungarian || Online || ? || Médiacom || Left, liberalism, investigative journalism || 
|-
| PestiSrácok || Hungarian || Online || 2012 || Gerilla Press Kft. || Right, conservatism, investigative journalism || 
|-
| Portfolio.hu || Hungarian English || Online || 1999 || NET Média || Left, liberalism, business and economics || 
|-
| Rossijskij Kurier || Russian || Online || ? || ? || Cultural || 
|-
|Színes Ász
|Hungarian
|Print
|2004
|Színesászmédia Kft.
|Tabloid
| -
|-
|  Szeretlek Magyarország || Hungarian || Online || ? || Szeretlek Magyarország Médiacsoport || Cultural || 
|-
|Telex
|HungarianEnglish
|Online
|2020
|Van Másik Kft.
|Left, liberalism
|telex.hu
|-
| Ungarn Heute || German || Online || ? || Friends of Hungary Foundation || Cultural || 
|-
|Vasárnap
|Hungarian
|Online
|?
|Kovács K. Zoltán Alapítvány
|Right, conservatism, Catholic journalism
|vasarnap.hu
|-
|Válasz Online
|Hungarian
|Online
|2018
|Válasz Online Kiadó Kft.
|Centre, investigative journalism
|valaszonline.hu
|-
|Velvet
|Hungarian
|Online
|2002
|Indamedia Network Zrt.
|Tabloid
|velvet.hu
|-
|Világgazdaság
|Hungarian
|Online
|1969
|Mediaworks
|Right, business and finance
|vg.hu
|-
| Zsúrpubi || Hungarian || Online || ? || HUNGÁRIA MÉDIA || Right, national radicalism || zsurpubi.hu
|}

Weekly 
{| class="sortable wikitable"
! style="width:8%;"| Title
! style="width:6%;"| Language
! style="width:3%;"| Print / Online
! style="width:3%;"| Est.
! style="width:25%;"| Owner
! style="width:25%;"| Orientation
! style="width:20%;"| Link
|- 
| 168 Óra || Hungarian || Both || 1989 || Brit Media Group || Left, liberalism || 
|-
| A Szabadság || Hungarian || Both || 1989 || Hungarian Workers' Party || Left, Far-left, communism || 
|-
| Csók és Könny || Hungarian || Print || 1992 || Ringier-Axel Springer || Love stories, mysteries of mind and body || -
|-
| Evangélikus Élet || Hungarian || Both || 1933 || Evangelical-Lutheran Church in Hungary || Lutheran journalism || 
|-
| Élet és Irodalom || Hungarian || Both || 1923 || Élet és Irodalom Baráti Társaság Élet és Irodalom Alapítvány || Left, liberalism, literary and political life || 
|-
| Élet és Tudomány || Hungarian || Both || 1946 || Society for Dissemination of Scientific Knowledge (Tudományos Ismeretterjesztő Társulat, TIT) || Scientific, educational || 
|-
| Fanny || Hungarian || Print || ? || ? || Women's magazine || -
|-
| Foaia Românească || Romanian || Both || ? || ? || Cultural journalism of minorities || 
|-
| Füles || Hungarian || Print || 1957 || Central Media Group ||Puzzle magazine || -
|-
| Hetek || Hungarian || Both || 1997 || Faith Church, Hungary || Pentecostal journalism, yellow journalism || 
|-
| Heti Világgazdaság (HVG) || Hungarian || Both || 1979 || HVG Kiadó || Left, liberalism, business and economics || 
|-
| HOT! || Hungarian || Print || 2006 || Mediaworks || Tabloid || -
|-
| Hrvatski glasnik || Croatian language || Both || 1991 || Croatica || Cultural journalism of minorities || 
|-
|Jelen
|Hungarian
|Both
|2020
|Liberty Press Bt.
|Left, liberalism
|jelen.media
|-
| Kiskegyed || Hungarian || Both || 2000 || Ringier-Axel Springer || Tabloid, women's magazine || 
|-
| Ľudové noviny || Slovak language || Both || 1957 || SlovakUm || Cultural journalism of minorities || 
|-
|Mandiner
|Hungarian
|Both
|1999
|KESMA
|Right, conservatism
|mandiner.hu
|-
| Magyar Demokrata || Hungarian || Both || 1989 || Artamondo Kft. || Right, conservatism || 
|-
|Magyar Hang
|Hungarian
|Both
|2018
|Alhambra Press Bt.
|Right, liberalism
|hang.hu
|-
| Magyar Narancs || Hungarian || Both || 1989 ||  Magyarnarancs.hu || Left, liberalism || 
|-
|Munkások Újsága
|Hungarian
|Both
|2011
|Yes Solidarity for Hungary Movement
|Left, democratic socialism
|muon.hu
|-
| Neue Zeitung || German language || Both || 1957 || Neue Zeitung Stiftung || Cultural journalism of minorities || 
|-
| Nők Lapja || Hungarian || Both || 1949 || Central Media Group || Women's magazine || 
|-
|Országút
|Hungarian
|Both
|2020
|Magyar Szemle Alapítvány
|Right, conservatism, literary and political life
|orszagut.com
|-
| Orvosi Hetilap || Hungarian || Print || 1857 || Hungarian Academy of Sciences || Medical journalism || -
|-
| Pester Lloyd || German || Online || 1853 || Pester Lloyd || Left, liberalism || 
|-
|Pesti Hírlap
|Hungarian
|Both
|2020
|Brit Media Group
|Centre, liberalism
|pestihirlap.hu
|-
| Reformátusok Lapja || Hungarian || Both || 1957 || Reformed Church in Hungary || Calvinist journalism || 
|-
|Ripost7
|Hungarian
|Both
|2015
|KESMA
|Right, sensationalism, tabloid
|
|-
| Sport plusz || Hungarian || Print || ? || ? || Sports || 
|-
| Srpske narodne novine || Serbian language || Print || ? || ? || Cultural journalism of minorities || ? 
|-
| Story || Hungarian || Both || ? || ? || Tabloid || 
|-
| Szabad Föld || Hungarian || Both || 1944 || KESMA || Right, rural magazine || 
|-
| Tvr-hét || Hungarian || Both || ? || Ringier-Axel Springer || TV Guide || 
|-
| Új Ember || Hungarian || Both || 1945 || Catholic Church in Hungary || Catholic journalism || 
|-
| Új Egyenlőség || Hungarian || Online || 2016 || Új Egyenlőség Alapítvány || Left, social democracy, Nordic model || 
|-
| Vasárnap Reggel|| Hungarian|| Print || ? || KESMA || Tabloid || -
|}

Biweekly 
 Autó-Motor (classic, car magazine)
Hócipő (satirical political magazine)

Monthly

Bimonthly 
 TermészetBÚVÁR (scientific journal, especially geographical and biological topics)

Regional 
 by County

 by Municipality
 Budai Polgár - Budapest, II. (biweekly)
 Debreceni Főnix - Debrecen (monthly, Reformed youth culture newspaper)
 Pándi Tükör - Pánd (quarterly, public and culture life)

Monthly newspapers

Tabloid
Best

Teenager
POPCORN (music)
DUE Tallózó

Other papers

Science
3.évezred

Entertainment
Exit
IgenHír
Pesti Est
Pesti Műsor

Defunct newspapers

See also 

 List of magazines in Hungary
 Media in Hungary
 Telecommunications in Hungary

References

Media monitoring
 IMEDIA, Media monitoring
 Gy&K PR, Media monitoring and Marketing Ltd

Newspapers

Hungary
Hungarian-language newspapers